Kurskaya is a station on the Arbatsko–Pokrovskaya line of the Moscow Metro.

Name
It is named for the Kursky railway station located nearby.

Building
Designed by L. M. Polyakov and completed in 1938, the station has tiled walls and gray marble pylons with sconce light fixtures and circular ventilation grilles.

Transfers

Moscow Metro stations
Railway stations in Russia opened in 1938
Arbatsko-Pokrovskaya Line
Railway stations located underground in Russia